Manitoba Provincial Road 357 is a provincial road in the southwestern section of the Canadian province of Manitoba.

Route description 

PR 357 begins at PTH 10 just south of Erickson, and terminates at PTH 5 near the small community of Birnie. 

PR 357 is an east-west highway providing access to the unincorporated communities of Mountain Road and Hilltop, where it intersects with PR 262. Although the road also has two significant north-south jaunts, it is generally quite straight. The road does contain a few sharp curves, notably on its descent to its eastbound terminus with PTH 5.

The route is paved for its entire length. The speed limit is 100 km/h (62.5 mph).

References

External links 
Manitoba Official Map - West Central

357